Proper digital arteries may refer to:

 Proper plantar digital arteries
 Proper palmar digital arteries